The Calgary Roughnecks are a lacrosse team based in Calgary, Alberta. The team plays in the National Lacrosse League (NLL). The 2023 season is the 21st in franchise history.

With the departure of Curtis Dickson to free agency, the Roughnecks named Jesse King as their ninth captain prior to the start of the season. Eli Salama and Curtis Manning were named assistant captains.

Regular season

Final standings

Game log

Pre-season
Reference:

Regular season

Roster

References:

Entry Draft
The 2022 NLL Entry Draft took place on September 10, 2022.

The Calgary Roughnecks selected:

References

2023 in Canadian sports
Calgary
Calgary Roughnecks seasons